Banking software is enterprise software that is used by the banking industry to provide and manage the financial products they provide.  Within retail banks, banking software typically refers to core banking software and all its interfaces that allows them to connect to other modular software and to the interbank networks. Within investment banking, banking software typically refer to the trading software used to access capital markets.

Categories

Retail banks

Commercial or retail banks use what is known as core banking software which records and manages the transactions made by the banks' customers to their accounts.  For example, it allows a customer to go to any branch of the bank and do its banking from there. In essence, it frees the customer from their home branch and enables them to do banking anywhere. Further, the bank's databases can be connected to other channels such as ATMs, Internet Banking, payment networks and SMS based banking.

Banking software is used by millions of users across hundreds or thousands of branches. This means that the software must be managed on many machines even in a small bank.  The core banking system is a major investment for retail banks and maintaining and managing the system can represent a large part of the cost of running a bank.

Investment banks
Investment banks use software to manage their trading desks and their client's accountants.  These systems often connect to financial markets such as securities exchanges or third-party providers of such as Financial data vendors.

For example, a company such as Bloomberg is financial software, news, and data company that offers financial software tools such as analytics and equity trading platform to financial companies around the world through the Bloomberg Terminal. Another example is Reuters whose products specialize in financial information management, purchase order management, positions and risks, and financial instrument sales.

These types of companies provides control solutions and overall productivity for corporate treasury, improved workflow, central banking, bank treasury, Forex trading and global back-office operations. Examples of these back-office tasks include IT departments that keep the phones and computers running (operations architecture), accounting, and human resources (customer relations) and sales and marketing where they come in contact with their customers.

With the help of these software companies, there is efficiency and proper management of transactions both in the front and back offices of the banking firms and other financial institutions.

References

Banking
Financial software